Birao is the capital of Vakaga, one of the 14 prefectures of the Central African Republic and was an administrative post in the colony of Ubangui-Shari. In March 2007, the town was almost completely burnt down in the fighting between rebels and government troops in the area.

History

Under Bokassa
Jean-Bédel Bokassa, the military ruler of the Central African Republic in the 1960s and 1970s, sent the family of Alexandre Banza to Birao after Banza attempted to overthrow him. Birao was isolated from the rest of the country and Banza's family was monitored by Bokassa. Banza's wife and nine children were kept in Birao until 1970. Beouane and Goboulo, Banza's two brothers, were also kept in Birao, but were soon imprisoned.

Birao was considered an undesirable place to be sent; the "disciplinary cells" in the Ngaragba Prison run by Bokassa were called Birao. Later, after Bokassa had fallen from power and his execution sentence had been commuted, sending Bokassa to Birao was considered a possibility because the remote location of the place would separate him from his political allies.

Central African Republic Bush War

In November 2004, at least 20 people were killed in a raid on the remote town of Birao in the north-east of the Central African Republic.

2006
On October 29, 2006, a force of around 150 rebels took the town of Birao, which is close to the border with Sudan and Chad. The rebels from the UFDR movement say some government troops joined them, and others were taken prisoner. The CAR government accused Sudan of being behind that attack.

On November 14, France, the traditional backer of the CAR government, offered the CAR military assistance in the form of logistics and aerial reconnaissance. France already had a regular 200-soldier contingent in the CAR supplementing the 5,000-soldier army of the CAR itself. On that day, the UFDR announced that they had suspended military activities in favour of negotiations.

On November 17, Chad's parliament approved troop deployment to the CAR. The CAR government appealed to the United Nations to send troops, and United Nations Secretary-General Kofi Annan called for the attacks in CAR's border with Darfur to end. Chad's decision to deploy troops to the CAR came as hopes for a deal with Sudan over peacekeeping forces in Darfur proved premature.

On December 14, France admitted having performed air raids against UFDR positions since the beginning of December, employing Mirage F1 fighters and helicopter gunships, and including an attack on the UFDR-controlled town of Birao. French Defence Ministry spokesman said the action was "in line with international calls to stabilise the region". UFDR reports claim that the raids had a devastating effect on the civilian population.

2007 

On April 13, 2007, a peace agreement between the government and the UFDR was signed in Birao. The agreement provides for an amnesty for the UFDR, its recognition as a political party, and the integration of its fighters into the army.

In March 2007, the Union of Democratic Forces for Unity attacked the French army and the armed forces of the Central African Republic (FACA), which held Birao at the time. Students who used to attend the secondary school in Birao were in the UFDR forces.

Later fighting
On 10 October 2010, LRA invaded Birao. They looted the main market and kidnapped nine children. On November 15, 2010, United Nations forces returned control of Birao to the government of the Central African Republic. Later in November, a rebel group called the Convention of Patriots for Justice and Peace captured Birao. On December 1, 2010, Birao was captured by the army of Chad, on behalf of the government of the Central African Republic. In September 2011, LRA attacked Birao and abducted 12 girls and 5 boys.

On 26 June 2014 international forces left Birao following ultimatum by Popular Front for the Rebirth of Central African Republic (FPRC) armed group. On 14 July 2019 clashes erupted between MLCJ and FPRC in Birao after two people were arrested by FPRC fighters four days before. Four FPRC militiamen were killed and the two individuals were subsequently executed. On 1 September MLCJ attacked FPRC positions in Birao leading to 23 FPRC and eight MLCJ fighters being killed. The following day the town was captured by MLCJ. On 14 September FPRC attacked Birao which was repelled. 37 FPRC and 11 MLCJ fighters were killed. On February 17, 2020, members of the Popular Front for the Rebirth of Central Africa (FPRC) attacked MINUSCA forces in Birao, leading to 12 FPRC militants being killed. On 15 March 2022 Russian mercenaries from Wagner Group temporarily entered Birao before returning to N'dele. On 7 December 2022 Russians supported by armed forces established permanent base in Birao.

Climate
Birao has a hot semi-arid climate (Köppen BSh), more akin to N'Djamena or Niamey than to the rest of the Central African Republic. The wet season lasts from May to September, peaking in July and August, and is cooler by day than the long dry season but just as uncomfortable due to the higher humidity.

See also

Bhimrao

Notes

References
Kalck, Pierre. Historical Dictionary of the Central African Republic. Lanham, MD: Scarecrow, 2005.Google Books. Google. Web. 8 Dec. 2010. <https://books.google.com/books?id=tbDFlvQeps0C&pg=PA24&dq=Birao&hl=en&ei=YiYATfW-I8einQe18PHlDQ&sa=X&oi=book_result&ct=result&resnum=5&ved=0CDwQ6AEwBDgU#v=onepage&q=Birao&f=false>.
Titley, E. Brian. Dark Age: the Political Odyssey of Emperor Bokassa. Montreal: McGill-Queen's UP, 1997. Google Books. Google. Web. 8 Dec. 2010. <https://books.google.com/books?id=kEPbRmivj7IC&pg=PA43&dq=Birao&hl=en&ei=YiYATfW-I8einQe18PHlDQ&sa=X&oi=book_result&ct=result&resnum=6&ved=0CEEQ6AEwBTgU#v=onepage&q=Birao&f=false>.

External links 
Humanitarian and Development Partners | Central African Republic: Growing up in a burnt down city

Sub-prefectures of the Central African Republic
Populated places in Vakaga